Jeffrey Alan Rineer (born July 3, 1955) is a former Major League Baseball pitcher.

External links

1955 births
Living people
Baseball players from Pennsylvania
Baltimore Orioles players
Franklin & Marshall Diplomats baseball players
Major League Baseball pitchers
Bluefield Orioles players
Charlotte O's players
Miami Orioles players
Rochester Red Wings players